Meghana Erande (or Meghna Sudhir Erande, Mēghanā Sudhīr Ēraṇḍē) is an Indian actress and voice actress who can speak English, Hindi and Marathi. She has voiced characters in Indian animation and has also dubbed for foreign content into Hindi and Marathi. She has been acting in the industry ever since 1989 and is in a marriage with Vikram Joshi since 18 November 2010.

Filmography
She worked on regional national channel on a programme called DAHAVI DIWALI.

Animated films

Dubbing career
Meghana Erande had a well known history for dubbing in her career. She has dubbed Canadian actress Pamela Anderson's role as C. J. Parker in Baywatch, on all the episodes on the seasons she appeared in, and other films since as for some roles in some of the Barbie films and other roles as well, such as Denise Richards's role as Kelly Lanier Van Ryan in Wild Things and Angelina Jolie's role as Police Officer Amelia Donaghy in The Bone Collector, both of which were dubbed in Hindi much later in 2010.

She can do voices for children, teenage girls and young women, and she has also dubbed for many Bollywood actresses.

Dubbing roles

Animated series

Live action television series

Live action films

Animated films

See also
Dubbing (filmmaking)
List of Indian Dubbing Artists

References

External links

Year of birth missing (living people)
Place of birth missing (living people)
Actresses from Mumbai
Indian voice actresses
Living people
Actresses in Hindi cinema
Actresses in Marathi cinema
21st-century Indian actresses